The 2012–13 South Florida Bulls men's basketball team represented the University of South Florida Bulls during the 2012–13 NCAA Division I men's basketball season. This was the 42nd season of basketball for USF and its 8th season as a member of the Big East Conference. The team was coached by Stan Heath in his sixth year at the school. USF played its home games at the newly renovated USF Sun Dome. They finished the season 12–19, 3–15 in Big East play to finish in a tie for 13th place. They lost in the first round of the Big East tournament to Seton Hall.

This was the Bulls' final season in the Big East Conference, as they joined the American Athletic Conference the next season.

Off season
After completing massive renovations to the USF Sun Dome, the Bulls will return to their home venue after a year away. The opening game was scheduled to be on November 10 against rival UCF.

USF was selected to play in the Big East-SEC Challenge and will host Georgia on November 30.

At Big East Media day, USF was selected to finish in 8th place in the Big East Preseason Coaches' Poll, their highest selection since joining the Big East in 2005. Sophomore point guard, Anthony Collins was also awarded at Big East Media Day, being selected to the Preseason All-Big East Second Team.

Departures

Incoming Recruits

Season Highlights

USF notched its first ever win in the SEC-Big East Challenge with a home victory over Georgia on November 30. That victory helped the Big East Conference to a 9-3 victory over the SEC.

A number of USF players received honors during the season for their performance on the court.

Anthony Collins was honored by the Big East by being named to the Big East Honor Roll on December 2. On December 20, Collins was nominated as a candidate for the Bob Cousy Award, one of 85 nominees for the best collegiate Point Guard in the nation.

Victor Rudd picked up a pair of honors on December 23, being named the Big East Player of the Week  and being named the Oscar Robertson National Player of the Week by the United States Basketball Writers Association.

The Bulls finished the regular season with a record of 12-18, 3-15 in conference play. USF earned the #13 seed in the 2013 Big East men's basketball tournament, where they were eliminated in the first round with a 42-46 loss in overtime to Seton Hall.

USF finished the season with an overall record of 12-19 and were unable to qualify for a post season tournament.

This marked the end of USF's membership in the Big East before moving to the American Athletic Conference. The Bulls finished their run in the Big East with an overall record of 41-107 (.277).

Roster

 Shemiye McLendon will be ineligible for the 2012-2013 season due to NCAA transfer rules.

Schedule and results

|-
!colspan=12| Exhibition

|-
!colspan=12| Regular season

|-
!colspan=12| 2013 Big East men's basketball tournament

References

South Florida Bulls men's basketball seasons
South Florida Bulls
South Florida Bulls men's basketball team
South Florida Bulls men's basketball team